Popov (masculine), or Popova (feminine), is a common Russian, Bulgarian, Macedonian and Serbian surname. Derived from a Slavonic word pop ("priest"). The fourth most common Russian surname, it may refer to:
 
Alek Popov (born 1966), Bulgarian writer
Alexander Popov (disambiguation)
Aleksei Popov (disambiguation)
Anatoly Popov (born 1960), Russian politician, Prime Minister of Chechnya
Andrei Popov (disambiguation)
Angel Popov (born 1979), Bulgarian-born Qatari weightlifter
Apostol Popov (born 1982), Bulgarian football defender
Blagoy Popov (1902–1968)
Boris Popov (born 1941), Russian water polo player
Denis Popov (born 1979), Russian football player and manager
Denis Popov (footballer, born 2002), Russian football player
Denys Popov (born 1999), Ukrainian football player
Dimitar Popov (born 1970), Bulgarian footballer
Dimitar Ivanov Popov (1894–1975), Bulgarian organic chemist
Dimitar Iliev Popov (1927–2015), Bulgarian judge and Prime Minister
Dmitri Popov (disambiguation)
Duško Popov (1912–1981), Serbian double-agent, known as Tricycle
Egor Popov (1913–2001), Russian-American structural and seismic engineer
Fedot Popov (died between 1648 and 1654), Russian explorer
Gavriil Popov (composer) (1904–1972), Russian composer
Gavriil Popov (politician) (born 1936), Russian politician
George Basil Popov (1922–1998) a Russian-British entomologist born in Iran
Goran Popov (born 1984), Macedonian footballer
Haralan Popov (1907–1988), Bulgarian church minister
Hristian Popov (born 1990), Bulgarian football player
Ilya Popov (born 2000), Russian boxer
Ivelin Popov (born 1987), Bulgarian footballer
Katia Popov (1965–2018), Bulgarian-born American violinist
Leonid Popov (born 1945), Soviet cosmonaut
Luben Popov (born 1936), Bulgarian chess player
Markian Popov (1902–1969), Soviet Army General
Mikhail Popov (disambiguation)
Nikolay Popov (1931–2008), Russian engineer
Oleg Popov (1930–2016), Russian circus artist
Pavel Popov (born 1957), Russian military officer
Polina Popova (born 1995), Miss Russia 2017
Pyotr Popov (born 1985), Russian luger
Pyotr Semyonovich Popov (1923–1960), Soviet intelligence officer and double agent
Robert Popov (born 1982), Macedonian footballer
Rumen Popov (born 1983), Bulgarian football player
Sergei Popov (disambiguation)
Serhiy Popov (born 1971), Ukrainian footballer
Stefan Popov (born 1940) a Bulgarian cellist 
Stole Popov (born 1950), Macedonian film director.
Strahil Popov (born 1990), Bulgarian footballer 
Valery Popov (disambiguation)
Vasile M. Popov (born 1928), Romanian-born scientist and systems theorist
Vasili Popov (disambiguation)
Victor Popov (1937–1994), Russian theoretical physicist
Vladimir Popov (disambiguation)
Yevgeni Popov (disambiguation)
Yuri Alexandrovich Popov (1936–2016), Russian paleoentomologist

Fictional people
 Nadia Popov, character in the British children's program Rentaghost

Popova
Alena Popova, Kazakhstani volleyballer
Daria Popova, Russian pair skater
Diana Popova, Bulgarian gymnast
Faton Popova, German footballer
Katarzyna Popowa-Zydroń, Polish pianist and pedagogue of Bulgarian descent
Ksenia Popova, Russian open water swimmer
Larisa Popova, Moldovan rower
Lyubov Popova (1889–1924), Russian avant-garde artist
Margarita Popova, former Bulgarian Minister of Justice
Mariana Popova (born 1978), Bulgarian singer
Nadezhda Popova, Soviet military pilot
Natalia Popova, Ukrainian figure skater
Natalia Popova (chess player) (born 1976), Belarusian chess master
Sofka Popova, Bulgarian runner
Tamara Popova, Soviet sprint canoer
Tatiana Popova, Russian basketball player
Valentina Popova (born 1972), Russian weightlifter
Vera Popova, Russian chemist
Veronika Popova, Russian swimmer

See also
Popovo (disambiguation)
Popovka (disambiguation)
Popović

Bulgarian-language surnames
Russian-language surnames
Occupational surnames